Andrew Grant DeYoung (May 12, 1974 – July 21, 2011) was an American who was convicted of and executed for the 1993 murder of his parents and sister in the state of Georgia. The state conducted the execution in H-5 of the Georgia Diagnostic and Classification State Prison (GDCP) in Jackson, Georgia. DeYoung was 19 when he committed the murders and 37 when he died. 

He was notable for having his execution videotaped. His lawyers had gained judicial permission for this to gain evidence as to "whether lethal injection caused unnecessary suffering."

Murders and trial
On June 14, 1993, the 19-year-old DeYoung repeatedly stabbed his mother, Kathryn, while she was sleeping. Awakened by her screams, his father Gary DeYoung struggled with Andrew before also being killed. Andrew DeYoung fatally stabbed his 14-year-old sister Sarah in the hallway outside their parents' bedroom. He had assigned an accomplice, David Michael Hagerty, to kill his 16-year-old brother Nathan, but the boy escaped through a bedroom window and ran to a neighbor's house for help.

On October 13, 1995, Andrew DeYoung was convicted by a jury of the first-degree murders of his parents, Gary and Kathryn DeYoung, and of his sister, Sarah.  According to the prosecution, DeYoung killed his family in order to collect an inheritance from their estate, which he estimated to be worth approximately $480,000.

Videotaping of execution
DeYoung was the first person in 19 years in the United States to have the execution videotaped and the first in which execution by lethal injection was recorded. The previous videotaped execution had been a gas chamber execution that took place in California. Other states are now considering videotaping executions.  There is open discussion concerning whether or not making executions public would sway people to be more for or more against the death penalty.

See also
 Capital punishment in Georgia (U.S. state)
 Capital punishment in the United States
 List of people executed in Georgia (U.S. state)
 List of people executed in the United States in 2011

References

1974 births
2011 deaths
1993 murders in the United States
People executed by Georgia (U.S. state) by lethal injection
21st-century executions by Georgia (U.S. state)
American people executed for murder
21st-century executions of American people
American people convicted of murder
People convicted of murder by Georgia (U.S. state)
Filmed executions
Familicides